Petrophile divaricata is a species of flowering plant in the family Proteaceae and is endemic to southwestern Western Australia. It is a shrub with bipinnate, sharply-pointed leaves, and oval to oblong heads of hairy, yellow flowers.

Description

Taxonomy
Petrophile divaricata was first formally described in 1830 by Robert Brown in the Supplementum to his Prodromus Florae Novae Hollandiae et Insulae Van Diemen from material collected by William Baxter near King Georges Sound in 1823. The specific epithet (divaricata) means "widely-spreading".

Distribution and habitat
This petrophile grows in heath, forest and woodland between Eneabba, Albany and the Fitzgerald River National Park in the Avon Wheatbelt, Esperance Plains, Jarrah Forest, Mallee and Swan Coastal Plain biogeographical regions of southwestern Western Australia.

Conservation status
Petrophile divaricata is classified as "not threatened" by the Western Australian Government Department of Parks and Wildlife.

References

divaricata
Eudicots of Western Australia
Endemic flora of Western Australia
Plants described in 1830
Taxa named by Robert Brown (botanist, born 1773)